Petrus Plancius (1552 – 15 May 1622) was a Dutch-Flemish astronomer, cartographer  and clergyman. He was born as Pieter Platevoet in Dranouter, now in Heuvelland, West Flanders. He studied theology in Germany and England. At the age of 24 he became a minister in the Dutch Reformed Church.

Plancius fled from Brussels to Amsterdam to avoid religious prosecution by the Inquisition after the city fell into Spanish hands in 1585. In Amsterdam he became interested in navigation and cartography and, having access to nautical charts recently brought from Portugal, he was soon recognized as an expert on safe maritime routes to India and the nearby "spice islands".  This enabled colonies and port trade in both, including what would become the Dutch East Indies, named after the Dutch East India Company set up in 1602. He saw strong potential in the little-mapped Arctic Sea and strongly believed in the idea of a Northeast Passage until the failure of Willem Barentsz's third voyage in 1597 seemed to preclude its viability.

Cartography

In 1592 Plancius published his best known world map, titled "Nova et exacta Terrarum Orbis Tabula geographica ac hydrographica". Only one remaining copy is known to exist, preserved at the Colegio del Corpus Christi in Valencia, Spain. This copy is not easily accessible to visitors. Plancius also published journals and navigational guides and developed a new method for determining longitude. He also promoted the Mercator projection for navigational maps.

Plancius was one of the founders of the Dutch East India Company, for which he drew over 100 maps.

Plancius was closely acquainted with Henry Hudson, an explorer of the New World.

Plancius prepared the map, Exacta & accurata delinatio… regionibus China, Cauchinchina, Camboja, sive Champa, Syao, Malacca, Arracan & Pegu, published in Jan Huygen van Linschoten's popular book, Itinerario (1596).

Uranography
In 1589 Plancius collaborated with the Amsterdam cartographer Jacob van Langren on a 32.5-cm celestial globe, which, using the sparse information available about southern celestial features, depicted Crux (the southern cross), Triangulum Australe (the southern triangle), and the Magellanic Clouds (Nubecula Major and Minor).

In 1595 Plancius trained Pieter Dirkszoon Keyser, the chief pilot on the Hollandia, to make astronomical observations to fill in the blank area around the south celestial pole on European maps of the southern sky. Keyser died in Java the following year – the expedition had many casualties – but his catalogue of 135 stars, probably developed with the help of Keyser's colleague Frederick de Houtman, was delivered to Plancius when the remaining ships returned.  These stars appear as 12 new southern constellations, on a 35-cm celestial globe designed by Plancius in late 1597 (or early 1598) and produced in collaboration with the Amsterdam cartographer Jodocus Hondius the Elder. The 12 new constellations (mostly referring to animals and subjects described in natural history books and travellers' journals of his day) are Apis the Bee (later changed to Musca by Lacaille), Apus the Bird of Paradise, Chamaeleon, Dorado the Goldfish (or Swordfish), Grus the Crane, Hydrus the Small Water Snake, Indus the Indian, Pavo the Peacock, Phoenix, Triangulum Australe the Southern Triangle, Tucana the Toucan, and Volans the Flying Fish. (The Southern Triangle and Southern Cross were reported as asterisms by earlier navigators and appear on earlier charts, but the globe of 1598 is the first surviving source that plots their locations reasonably accurately.)  Also notable is the inclusion of Achernar as Alpha Eridani. 

These constellations, together with the constellation Columba illustrated by Plancius on his large wall map of the world of 1592, were then incorporated in 1603 by Johann Bayer in his sky atlas, the Uranometria.

In 1612 (or 1613) Plancius introduced the following eight constellations on a 26.5-cm celestial globe published in Amsterdam by Pieter van der Keere: Apes the Bee, Camelopardalis the Giraffe (often interpreted as a Camel), Cancer Minor the Small Crab, Euphrates Fluvius et Tigris Fluvius the Rivers Euphrates and Tigris, Gallus the Cock, Jordanis Fluvius the River Jordan, Monoceros the Unicorn and Sagitta Australis the Southern Arrow. Of the latter constellations, only Camelopardalis and Monoceros are still found on modern star charts, and recognized by the IAU.

The minor planet 10648 Plancius commemorates his contributions in celestial and terrestrial cartography.

Maps

See also
 First Dutch Expedition to Indonesia

References

External links 

 
 

16th-century Flemish cartographers
16th-century Dutch cartographers
17th-century Dutch cartographers 
16th-century Dutch businesspeople
17th-century Dutch astronomers
17th-century Dutch businesspeople
17th-century Dutch Calvinist and Reformed ministers
1552 births
1622 deaths
Astronomy in the Dutch Republic
Cartography in the Dutch Republic
16th-century Dutch astronomers
Dutch company founders
Dutch West India Company people
Founders of the Dutch East India Company
People from West Flanders